Wired Science was a weekly television program that covered modern scientific and technological topics. In January 2007 PBS aired pilot episodes for three different science programs, including Wired Science. Using Nielsen ratings, CPB-sponsored research and public feedback, PBS selected Wired Science for a 10-episode run in the fall schedule. The program was a production of KCET Los Angeles. In July 2008, the show was officially cancelled.

References

External links
 Wired Science blog at Wired News
 Wired Science episode guide at PBS
 

PBS original programming
2000s American documentary television series
2007 American television series debuts
2007 American television series endings